Haus is a Germanic word meaning house. It may refer to:

People

 Anton Haus (1851–1917), Austrian grand admiral, fleet commander of the Austro-Hungarian Navy in World War I
 Georg Haus (1895–1945), German general
 Hermann A. Haus (1925–2003), Slovene-American physicist, electrical engineer and Institute Professor at the Massachusetts Institute of Technology
 Jacques-Joseph Haus (1796–1881), Belgian lawyer and professor
 Julie Haus (b 1973), American fashion designer
 Knut Haus (1915–2006), Norwegian politician
 Samuel Haus (born 1990), Swedish actor

Places
 Haus, Norway, a former municipality in Hordaland county, Norway
 Haus or Hausvik, a village in Osterøy municipality in Vestland county, Norway
 Haus Church, parish church in Hausvik
 Haus im Ennstal, city in Styria, Austria

Buildings 
 Haus am Horn, historic home in Weimar, Germany
 Haus Auensee, concert hall in Leipzig, Germany 
 Haus Bamenohl, castle in North Rhine-Westphalia, Germany
 Haus Carstanjen, castle on the River Rhine, Germany
 Haus Cumberland, Grade II listed building in Charlottenburg, Berlin
 Haus des Lehrers, congress center in Berlin
 Haus des Meeres, public aquarium in Vienna, Austria
 Haus des Rundfunks, historic broadcasting center in Berlin
 Haus Tambaran, a type of ancestral worship space in Papua New Guinea
 Haus Vaterland, former pleasure palace in Berlin, Germany
 Haus Wittgenstein, historic home in Vienna, Austria

Businesses and Organizations
 Haus Alkire, American fashion label
 Haus Altenberg, educational institution in Altenberg, Germany
 Haus der Geschichte, national museum of contemporary history, Berlin
 Haus der Kulturen der Welt, international center for contemporary arts, Berlin
 Haus der Kunst, art museum in Munich, Germany
 Haus der Musik, national museum of sound and music, Vienna, Austria
 Haus Konstruktiv, an arts foundation in Zürich, Switzerland
 Haus Laboratories, a cosmetics brand launched by Lady Gaga
 Haus Publishing, London-based publishing company

Music
 "Haus am See", song released in 2008 by German musician Peter Fox
Haus der Lüge, 1989 album by the German band Einstürzende Neubauten
"Haus of Holbein", song from pop musical Six (musical)
Haus Party, Pt. 1, 2019 album by Todrick Hall
Haus Party, Pt. 2, 2019 album by Todrick Hall

Science
The category of Hausdorff space with continuous maps, in mathematics
 HAUS1, a human gene
 HAUS3, a human gene
 HAUS6, a human gene